Kingsey may refer to these places:
 Kingsey, a village in England
 Saint-Félix-de-Kingsey, Quebec, earlier known simply as "Kingsey"
 Kingsey Falls, Quebec